Manjeshwaram State assembly constituency is one of the 140 state legislative assembly constituencies in Kerala state in southern India. It is also one of the 7 state legislative assembly constituencies included in the Kasaragod Lok Sabha constituency.
 As of the 2021 assembly elections, the current MLA is A. K. M. Ashraf of Indian Union Muslim League.

Local self governed segments
Manjeshwar Niyamasabha constituency is composed of the following local self governed segments:

{ "type": "ExternalData",  "service": "geoshape",  "ids": "Q16135883,Q13111333,Q16134041,Q16134195,Q13114089,Q13113487,Q13113335,Q16134001"}

Members of Legislative Assembly
The following list contains all members of Kerala legislative assembly who have represented Manjeshwar Niyamasabha Constituency during the period of various assemblies:

Key

   

* indicates bypolls

Election results
Percentage change (±%) denotes the change in the number of votes from the immediately previous election.

2021 Kerala Legislative Assembly Election 
There were 2,21,682 registered voters in the constituency for the 2021 Kerala Niyamasabha Election.

2019 Kerala Legislative Assembly By-election 
Due to the death of sitting MLA P. B. Abdul Razak, a bypoll as held on 21 October 2019.

There were 2,14,779 registered voters in Manjeshwar constituency for this by-election. M. C. Kamaruddin won the election by 7923 votes in the election.

2016 Kerala Legislative Assembly election 
There were 2,08,165 registered voters in Manjeshwar Constituency for the 2016 Kerala Niyamasabha Election.

2011 Kerala Legislative Assembly election 
There were 1,76,817 registered voters in the constituency for the 2011 election.

See also
 Manjeshwaram
 Kasaragod district
 List of constituencies of the Kerala Legislative Assembly
 2016 Kerala Legislative Assembly election
 2019 Kerala Legislative Assembly by-elections

References 

Assembly constituencies of Kerala

State assembly constituencies in Kasaragod district